Khan al-Duwayr  was a Palestinian Arab village in the Safad Subdistrict. It was depopulated during the 1948 Arab-Israeli War on May 30, 1948, by the  Palmach's First Battalion of Operation Yiftach. It was located 35 km northeast of Safad. The ruins of the village were overbuilt by the Israeli kibbutz of Snir.

History

Ancient Laish/Dan
The village had a khirbat named Tall al-Qadi, which lay about 1 km to the northwest of the village. Tell el-Qadi has been identified as the site of the biblical city of Laish/Dan since the mid-19th century. Excavations at Tell el-Qadi/Tel Dan have brought to light substantial remains from the Early Bronze Age through Iron Age IIB, when Dan was destroyed by Tiglath-Pileser III in 733/2 BCE, and with continued occupation and/or cultic activities through to the Roman period.

Ottoman period
In 1875 Victor Guérin noted it as a hamlet called Khan Doueir. A small wood of oaks and terebinths grew close to it.

In 1881 the PEF's Survey of Western Palestine described Khan ed Duweir  as: "Two stone houses here contain about twenty Moslems; situated on slope of hill near the stream of water, with olives and arable cultivation around."

British Mandate
In the 1931 census of Palestine conducted by the British Mandate authorities,  the population of Khan ed-Duwair was 137, all Muslims, in a total of 29 houses.

In the  1945 statistics  no Arabs were listed as inhabitants, while the nearby Dan had a population of 260, and Arabs still owned 2,163 dunams of the land. Of this, they used 2,067  for plantations and irrigable land, while  96 were used for cereals.

1948, aftermath

On 12 April 1948, prior to the outbreak of the 1948 Arab-Israeli war,  Israel Galili wrote to Yosef Weitz recommending that new settlements be established at the site of a number of Arab villages, including  Khan al-Duwayr, 'as soon as possible'. Norman Finkelstein, quoting Benny Morris, notes this recommendation was made even though most of the sites had not yet been depopulated.

On the 22 April, 1948, Haganah command agreed to provide the manpower to set up settlements on non−Arab land in several Arab villages; one of the villages mentioned was Khan al-Duwayr.

According to the Israel–Syria Mixed Armistice Commission, Khan al-Duwayr was part of the DM after the 1948 war. Israel, however, gradually managed to evict all the Arab inhabitants of the DM zone, using a "stick and carrot" method.

Dafna is located about 3 km southwest of the Khan al-Duwayr site, while Dan 2 km to the west of the site: neither is on village land.

In 1992 the village site was described: "The site is deserted, overgrown with grass. Only the ruins of a khan (caravansary) are visible. The surrounding land is either cultivated by Israelis, or used as forest or pasture."

References

Bibliography

External links
Welcome To Khan al-Duwayr
 Khan al-Duwayr, Villages of Palestine
 Khan al-Duwayr,  Zochrot
Survey of Western Palestine, Map 2:   IAA, Wikimedia commons

Arab villages depopulated during the 1948 Arab–Israeli War
District of Safad